São Brás is a municipality located in the Brazilian state of Alagoas. Its population was 6,969 (2020) and its area is 140 km².

References

Municipalities in Alagoas